Hialeah Gardens is a city in Miami-Dade County, Florida, United States. The population was 23,068 at the 2020 census, up from 21,744 in 2010. The population density is 7,160 persons per square mile, made up of mostly single-story development.

History
The municipality sprouted from humble beginnings at Walter C. Ohlerts Tourist Camp. By way of 26 unanimous votes, the town of Hialeah Gardens achieved incorporation in December 1948.

In February 1949, Hialeah Gardens adopted its first building code, its first traffic ordinance, and the first laws regarding hunting. Hialeah Gardens served mainly as a rural community in which one of its main industries was raising horses. This existed until 1968 when the city adopted an aggressive land use and zoning master plan to lead the growth of the city. Only a small number of small businesses existed along the Okeechobee Road corridor. The city's close proximity to major roadways, such as Okeechobee Road (U.S. Route 27 / State Road 25) and the Palmetto Expressway (State Road 826), provided the opportunity for Hialeah Gardens to become one of the fastest growing municipalities in the county.

Geography
Hialeah Gardens is located northwest of downtown Miami at  (25.878342, –80.348072). It is bordered to the north and east by the city of Hialeah and to the southwest by the town of Medley. U.S. Route 27 (Okeechobee Road) runs along the border with Medley, leading southeast  to its southern terminus at U.S. Route 1 in eastern Miami, and northwest  to Interstate 75 at the former Andytown.

Surrounding areas
  Unincorporated Miami-Dade County, Hialeah
  Unincorporated Miami-Dade County    Hialeah
 Unincorporated Miami-Dade County, Medley   Hialeah
  Medley    Hialeah
  Medley

Demographics

2020 census

As of the 2020 United States census, there were 23,068 people, 6,578 households, and 5,563 families residing in the city.

2010 census

As of 2010, there were 6,629 households, out of which 3.6% were vacant. In 2000, 47.5% had children under the age of 18 living with them, 64.7% were married couples living together, 15.7% had a female householder with no husband present, and 13.0% were non-families. 9.7% of all households were made up of individuals, and 4.7% had someone living alone who was 65 years of age or older. The average household size was 3.38 and the average family size was 3.56.

In 2000, the city population was spread out, with 27.7% under the age of 18, 8.1% from 18 to 24, 32.9% from 25 to 44, 20.9% from 45 to 64, and 10.5% who were 65 years of age or older. The median age was 34 years. For every 100 females, there were 92.9 males. For every 100 females age 18 and over, there were 88.1 males.

In 2000, the median income for a household in the city was $38,858, and the median income for a family was $39,804. Males had a median income of $25,540 versus $20,862 for females. The per capita income for the city was $14,043. About 10.9% of families and 13.3% of the population were below the poverty line, including 16.4% of those under age 18 and 21.0% of those age 65 or over.

As of 2000, Hialeah Gardens has the highest percentage of Spanish-speakers of any city in United States (neighboring Hialeah is second). As of 2000, 95.69% of the population spoke Spanish at home, while those who spoke only English made up 4.31% of the population.

Education
Miami-Dade County Public Schools serves Hialeah Gardens.

From 2007 to 2009 construction began on 3 new schools in the Area along Hialeah Gardens Blvd and Okeechobee. West Hialeah Gardens Elementary School opened in the 2007–2008 school year and was used to Alleviate nearby Hialeah Gardens Elementary School and Ernest R Graham Elementary School. Hialeah Gardens Middle opened in 2008–2009 school year to alleviate Jose Marti Middle School in neighboring West Hialeah as well as Mater Academy Middle School and Youth Co-Op Charter School. Hialeah Gardens High was opened in the Fall of 2009 to alleviate Barbara Goleman Senior High in Miami Lakes

Hialeah Gardens High School serves Hialeah Gardens.

Mater Academy Middle/High School also serves the Hialeah Gardens area

Notable people
 Albert Almora, baseball player for the New York Mets
 Manny Machado, baseball player for the San Diego Padres

References

External links
 
 

Cities in Miami-Dade County, Florida
Cities in Florida
Hispanic and Latino American culture in Florida
Cities in Miami metropolitan area
Populated places established in 1948
1948 establishments in Florida